William Dennis Murphy (born October 24, 1944) is an American equestrian. He competed in the individual jumping event at the 1976 Summer Olympics.

References

External links
 

1944 births
Living people
American male equestrians
Olympic equestrians of the United States
Equestrians at the 1976 Summer Olympics
Pan American Games medalists in equestrian
Pan American Games gold medalists for the United States
Equestrians at the 1975 Pan American Games
Sportspeople from Birmingham, Alabama
Medalists at the 1975 Pan American Games